Jonny Holmstrom is a Swedish professor of Informatics at Umeå University and director and co-founder of Swedish Center for Digital Innovation.

Biography
Holmstrom was born in Arvidsjaur in 1968. He received his Ph.D. from Umeå University in 2000, and has been a visiting scholar at Georgia State University and Florida International University. Holmstrom is a senior editor at Information and Organization and serves at the editorial boards for European Journal of Information Systems and Communications of the AIS. Holmstrom has written 2 books and has published over 100 scholarly articles in professional journals and edited volumes.

Career
Holmstrom is a professor of Informatics at Umeå University and director and co-founder of the Swedish Center for Digital Innovation. His work has appeared in journals including Communications of the AIS, Convergence, Design Issues, European Journal of Information Systems, Industrial Management and Data Systems, Information and Organization, Information Resources Management Journal, Information Systems Journal, Information Technology and People, Journal of the AIS, Journal of Strategic Information Systems, Research Policy, and The Information Society.

IT and Organizational Change
Holmstrom's early work examined the interaction between information technology and organizations. Prior research often assumed information technology to be either an objective, external force with deterministic impacts on organizations, or the outcome of social action. Holmstrom's research suggested that either view is incomplete, and he proposed to take both perspectives into account. Drawing from actor-network theory as analytical lens, Holmstrom has explored the role of IT in contexts such as municipal organizations, airports, and digital cash projects. In these studies, Holmstrom stressed the notion of non-human agency in which processes, technological tools and other similar concepts can be viewed as non-human actors that acquire an identity of their own.

Digital Innovation
In more recent research, Holmstrom has addressed digital innovation and digital transformation, specifically how organizations are dealing with “the digitization of everything” as a challenge and an opportunity. To deal with digital transformation, Holmstrom argues that organizations need to develop a comprehensive digital strategy. Holmstrom's research addresses how digital capabilities increasingly determines which companies create or lose value. Among these studies we find studies of firms in the mining industry, the paper and pulp industry, and the publishing industry. He also published a Harvard Business School case focusing on the ways in which digitization brings challenges as well as opportunities to firms in the publishing industry.

Awards
Holmstrom was awarded a post-doctoral fellowship by the STINT Foundation (The Swedish Foundation for International Co-operation in Research and Higher Education) for post-doctoral research at Georgia State University, Atlanta, GA in 2000/2001. He was also awarded a fellowship by the STINT Foundation to enable a visiting research position at Decision Sciences and Information Systems Department, College of Business Administration, Florida International University, Miami, FL, USA, in 2004. Holmstrom received Royal Skytteanska Samfundets award for young researchers at the Social Sciences faculty, Umeå University, in 2005, and Nordea’s Scientific Award 2007. In 2009 he received Umeå University's Young Researcher Award and the AIS senior scholars award for best IS journal paper of the year in 2010. Holmstrom was also awarded with the Pedagogical Award of the Year in the IS discipline in Sweden 2011 by the Swedish Association of Information Systems.

References

External links
Homepage at Umeå University
Homepage at Swedish Center for Digital Innovation

Swedish computer scientists
Academic staff of Umeå University
1968 births
People from Arvidsjaur Municipality
Information scientists
Living people